Maddur Subba Reddy was an Indian politician. He was a Member of Parliament, representing Nandyal in the Lok Sabha, the lower house of India's Parliament, as a member of the Telugu Desam Party.

References

External links
Official biographical sketch in Parliament of India website

Lok Sabha members from Andhra Pradesh
Telugu Desam Party politicians
India MPs 1984–1989
1914 births
Year of death missing